Béla Guttmann (27 January 1899 – 28 August 1981) was a Hungarian footballer and coach. He was born in Budapest, Austria-Hungary, and was Jewish. He was deported by the Nazis to a Nazi slave labor camp where he was tortured; he survived the Holocaust. 

Before the war, he played as a midfielder for MTK Hungária FC, SC Hakoah Wien, and several clubs in the United States. Guttmann also played for the Hungary national football team, including at the 1924 Olympic Games.  

Guttmann coached in ten countries from 1933 to 1974, and won ten national championships and, most notably, two back-to-back European Cups with Benfica. He also coached the national teams of Hungary and Austria, having also coached club football in the Netherlands, Italy, Brazil, Uruguay, and Portugal. He is perhaps best remembered as a coach and manager after the war of A.C. Milan, São Paulo FC, FC Porto, Benfica, and C.A. Peñarol. His greatest success came with Benfica when he guided them to two successive European Cup wins, in 1961 and in 1962. 

He pioneered the 4–2–4 formation along with Márton Bukovi and Gusztáv Sebes, forming a triumvirate of radical Hungarian coaches, and is also credited with mentoring Eusébio. However, throughout his career he was never far from controversy. Widely travelled, as both a player and coach, he rarely stayed at a club longer than two seasons, and was quoted as saying "the third season is fatal". He was sacked at Milan while they were top of Serie A, and he walked out on Benfica after they allegedly refused a request for a pay rise, allegedly leaving the club with a curse.

Early life
Guttmann was born in Budapest, Austria-Hungary, and was Jewish. His parents Abraham and Ester were dance teachers. He became a trained dance instructor himself, at 16 years of age. He obtained a Psychology degree in Austria.

Playing career

Club career
Guttmann was a prominent member of the MTK Hungária FC team of the early 1920s. Playing halfback or center half alongside Gyula Mándi, he helped MTK win Hungarian League titles in 1920 and 1921. 

In 1922 Guttmann moved to Vienna, Austria, to escape the anti-semitism in Hungary of the Admiral Horthy regime, as during 1919 to 1921 up to 3,000 of his fellow Hungarian Jews were murdered in a campaign known as the White Terror, orchestrated by the Hungarian nationalist government. In Vienna he joined the all-Jewish club SC Hakoah Wien and played for them as their centre back from 1922 to 1926 and in 1933. For the team's shirts, they wore the blue and white of the Zionist national movement, and a large Star of David was their badge. In 1925 he won another league title when Hakoah won the Austrian League. In April 1926 the SC Hakoah Wien squad sailed to New York to begin a ten-match tour of the United States. On 1 May a crowd of 46,000 watched them play an American Soccer League XI at the Polo Grounds, a US record for a soccer game until 1977. The ASL team won 3–0. At least six of the Hakoah players were later killed in the Holocaust.

Following the tour Guttmann, who was Hakoah's most prominent player, and several of his teammates decided to stay on in the US. After initially playing for Brooklyn Wanderers, he signed for the New York Giants of the American Soccer League (ASL), playing 83 games and scoring two goals over two seasons. In 1928, the Giants were suspended from the ASL as part of the "Soccer War", a dispute pitting the ASL and United States Soccer Federation. 

Guttmann and the Giants joined the Eastern Soccer League, but he soon moved to New York Hakoah, a team made-up of former SC Hakoah Wien players, including Rudolph Nickolsburger. In 1929 he helped them win the U.S. Open Cup (then known as National Challenge Cup). 

After a merger with Brooklyn Hakoah, they became the Hakoah All-Stars in 1930. In the fall of 1930 Guttmann rejoined the Giants, now known as the New York Soccer Club, but was back at the All-Stars in the spring of 1931 where he finished his career as a player. When he retired as a player he was 32 years old, and had played 176 ASL games. 

As well as playing football, while in New York, Guttmann also taught dance, bought into a speakeasy, invested in the stock market, and almost lost everything after the Wall Street Crash of 1929.

Hungarian international

Between 1921 and 1924, Guttmann also played six times for the Hungary national football team, scoring on his debut on 5 June 1921 in a 3–0 win against Germany. Later in the same month he also played against a Southern Germany XI. His remaining four appearances all came in May 1924 in games against Switzerland, Saarland, Poland, and Egypt. The latter two were at the 1924 Olympic Games in Paris. During the preparations for the competition Guttmann objected to the fact that there were more officials than players in the Hungary squad. He also complained that the hotel was more suitable for socialising than match preparation, and to demonstrate his disapproval he hung dead rats on the doors of the travelling officials.

Coaching career
Guttmann coached two dozen teams in ten countries, from 1933 to 1974, and won two European Cups, and ten national championships. He also coached the national teams of Hungary, Austria, the Netherlands, Italy, Brazil, Uruguay, and Portugal. As a coach, tactically he pioneered the 4–2–4 formation, and had his teams play fearless attacking football. In addition, he required that his players follow his regime of diet, rigorous fitness, and hard training.

Return to Europe; Nazi forced labor camp
Guttmann returned to Europe in 1932 and in the years before the outbreak of the Second World War he coached teams in Austria, The Netherlands, and Hungary. He had spells with his former club SC Hakoah Wien, and then Dutch side SC Enschede.

He then had his first serious success with Újpest FC in the 1938–39 season, winning the Hungarian League and the Mitropa Cup (the precursor to the European Cup). Shortly thereafter, anti-Jewish laws introduced by the Hungarian government ensured Guttmann lost his job.

During the destruction of Hungarian Jewry, after the Nazis occupied Hungary in March 1944 and sent most of Hungary's Jews to Nazi concentration camps where they were killed, Guttmann initially hid in an attic in Újpest, aided by his non-Jewish brother-in-law. He was then sent to a Nazi forced labor camp near Budapest where he was tortured. Years later he reminisced: "Our sergeant ... [had] learned how to torture people... Was I a footballer from the national team, was I a successful coach? Was I even a man? Who cared, you had to forget all about it." He escaped in December 1944, just before he was about to be sent to Auschwitz concentration camp, together with Ernest Erbstein, another famous Jewish-Hungarian coach. His 78-year-old father Abraham, older sister Szeren, and wider family were murdered in Auschwitz. For many years the story of what happened to him during the Holocaust was unclear, until David Bolchover wrote about it in his biography of Guttman, titled The Greatest Comeback.

After the war Guttmann briefly took charge at Budapest side Vasas SC from July 1945–1946.

He then joined Ciocanul in Romania in 1946. Due to food shortages, Guttmann insisted his salary be paid in vegetables. He subsequently walked out on the Romanian club after a director attempted to intervene in team selection. German journalist Hardy Grune believed that he was frustrated with the corruption in the Romanian soccer world.

Guttmann then in early 1947 rejoined Újpest FC, then known as Újpesti TE. He won another Hungarian League title.

He then succeeded Ferenc Puskás Sr. as coach at Hungarian side Kispest AC. In November 1948, Guttmann attempted to take off fullback Mihály Patyi at whose ungentlemanly play he was furious, leaving the team with 10 players. Encouraged by the team captain, Ferenc Puskás Jr, Patyi remained on the pitch and Guttmann retired to the stands, reading a racing paper, refusing to coach the team, quitting on the spot. This was his final game in charge of the team, and he departed soon after the falling out.

Italy
Like many other Hungarian footballers and coaches, Guttmann spent time in Italy. He first coached for spells with Calcio Padova and U.S. Triestina Calcio.

Guttmann was then appointed manager of A.C. Milan in 1953. With a team that included Gunnar Nordahl, Nils Liedholm, and Juan Alberto Schiaffino, Guttmann had them top of Serie A 19 games into his second season in charge when a string of disputes with the board led to his dismissal. He later told a stunned press conference "I have been sacked even though I am neither a criminal nor a homosexual. Goodbye." From then on he insisted on a clause in his contract that he could not be sacked if his team were top of the table. He subsequently managed a fourth Italian club Vicenza Calcio.

South America
Guttmann first went to South America on tour with the Hakoah All-Stars in the summer of 1930. In 1957, he returned as a coach with the Kispest AC team which included Ferenc Puskás, Zoltán Czibor, Sándor Kocsis, József Bozsik, László Budai, Gyula Lóránt, and Gyula Grosics. During a tour of Brazil, Kispest AC played a series of five games against CR Flamengo, Botafogo, and a Flamengo / Botafogo XI.

Guttmann then stayed on in Brazil and took charge in 1957 of São Paulo FC and with a team that included Dino Sani, Mauro, and Zizinho, won the São Paulo State Championship in 1957. It was while in Brazil that he helped popularise the 4–2–4 formation, which had been pioneered by fellow countrymen Márton Bukovi and Gusztáv Sebes, and was subsequently used by Brazil as they won the 1958 FIFA World Cup. Before finally retiring as coach, in 1962 Guttmann would return to South America to manage C.A. Peñarol, but was replaced in October by Peregrino Anselmo, who guided the side to the Uruguayan League title that very year.

Portugal

In 1958, Guttmann arrived in Portugal and embarked on the most successful spell of his career. He took charge of FC Porto and helped them overhaul a five-point lead enjoyed by Benfica to win his first of three Portuguese League titles in 1959. 

The following season, he jumped ship and joined Lisbon side Benfica. There he promptly sacked 20 senior players, promoted a host of youth players, and won the league again in 1960 and 1961. Under Guttmann, Benfica, with a team that included Eusébio, José Águas, José Augusto, Costa Pereira, António Simões, Germano, and Mário Coluna, also won the European Cup twice in a row. In 1961 they beat Barcelona 3–2 in the final and in 1962 they retained the title, coming from 2 to 0 and 3–2 down to beat Real Madrid 5–3. After the game, he was held aloft by fans.

Legend has it that Guttmann signed Eusébio after a chance meeting in a barber shop. Seated next to Guttmann was José Carlos Bauer, one of his successors at São Paulo. The Brazilian team were on tour in Portugal, and the coach mentioned an outstanding player he had seen while they toured Mozambique. Eusébio had also attracted the interest of Sporting CP. Guttmann moved quickly and signed the then 19-year-old for Benfica.

To celebrate Benfica's 110th birthday, a statue of Guttmann holding his two European Cups was unveiled. The statue made by Hungarian sculptor László Szatmári Juhos was placed at door 18 of the Estádio da Luz.

The "curse" of Béla Guttmann
After the 1962 European Cup Final, Guttmann reportedly approached the Benfica board of directors and asked for a pay rise. However, despite the success he had brought the club, he was turned down. On leaving Benfica, he allegedly cursed the club declaring, "Not in a hundred years from now will Benfica ever be European champions again". Later, on 6 April 1963, in an interview to A Bola, he stated, "Benfica, at this moment, are well served and do not need me. They will win the Campeonato Nacional and will be champions of Europe again." Benfica went on to reach five European Cup finals (1963, 1965, 1968, 1988, and 1990) but did not win any. Before the 1990 final, played in Vienna, Eusébio reportedly prayed at Guttmann's grave and asked for the alleged curse to be broken. According to David Bolchover, in his biography of Guttmann, there is no documentary evidence on Guttmann saying anything related to a curse and that the alleged curse was first mentioned in May 1988 by newspaper Gazeta dos Desportos, the day Benfica played their fifth final. The "curse" had its origins in March 1968 when A Bola published a loose and unsigned translation from German to Portuguese of an interview given by Guttmann to Sport-Illustrierte five months earlier, in October 1967. Moreover, in November 2011, Eusébio, who was coached by Guttmann, also denied the existence of the curse, calling it a "lie". In 2022, Benfica's under-19 team became European champions by winning the 2021–22 UEFA Youth League, thus ending the "curse".

Honours

Player
MTK Hungária FC
 Hungarian League: 1919–20, 1920–21

SC Hakoah Wien
 Austrian Champions: 1924–25

New York Hakoah
 National Challenge Cup: 1929

Manager
Újpest FC/Újpesti TE
 Hungarian League: 1938–39, 1946–47
 Mitropa Cup: 1939

São Paulo
 São Paulo State Champions: 1957

Porto
 Portuguese Liga: 1958–59

Benfica
 European Cup: 1960–61, 1961–62
 Primeira Divisão: 1959–60, 1960–61
 Taça de Portugal: 1961–62
 Intercontinental Cup runner-up: 1961

Peñarol
 Uruguayan Championship: 1962
 Copa Libertadores runner-up: 1962

Panathinaikos
 Greek Cup: 1966–67

Individual 

World Soccer 9th Greatest Manager of All Time: 2013
ESPN 16th Greatest Manager of All Time: 2013
France Football 20th Greatest Manager of All Time: 2019
Deutsche Presse-Agentur 3rd Greatest Eastern European Manager of the 20th Century: 1999

See also
List of select Jewish footballers

References

Bibliography
General

External links

Guttmann at United States Soccer Hall of Fame
Guttmann at www.jewsinsports.org
Guttmann at www.jewishsports.net
A Guttmann these days is hard to find by Jonathan Wilson
Unofficial International Appearance
UEFA biography
Biographical article on Guttmann, Bremen University 

1899 births
1981 deaths
Footballers from Budapest
Hungarian footballers
Jewish Hungarian sportspeople
Jewish footballers
Austro-Hungarian Jews
Association football defenders
Association football midfielders
Footballers at the 1924 Summer Olympics
Olympic footballers of Hungary
MTK Budapest FC players
SC Hakoah Wien footballers
Hungarian football managers
Újpest FC managers
Expatriate football managers in Romania
São Paulo FC managers
Calcio Padova managers
U.S. Triestina Calcio 1918 managers
Serie A managers
A.C. Milan managers
L.R. Vicenza managers
Budapest Honvéd FC managers
FK Austria Wien managers
Hungarian expatriate footballers
Hungary international footballers
Peñarol managers
FC Porto managers
S.L. Benfica managers
Expatriate football managers in Cyprus
Servette FC managers
Austria national football team managers
Panathinaikos F.C. managers
American Soccer League (1921–1933) players
Brooklyn Wanderers players
New York Giants (soccer) players
New York Hakoah players
New York Soccer Club players
Hakoah All-Stars players
Eastern Professional Soccer League (1928–29) players
Association football utility players
Expatriate soccer players in the United States
Expatriate football managers in Austria
Expatriate football managers in Brazil
Expatriate football managers in Greece
Expatriate football managers in Italy
Expatriate football managers in the Netherlands
Expatriate football managers in Portugal
Expatriate football managers in Switzerland
Hungarian expatriate sportspeople in Cyprus
Hungarian expatriate sportspeople in Portugal
APOEL FC managers
UEFA Champions League winning managers
Quilmes Atlético Club managers
SC Hakoah Wien managers
Maccabi București managers
Vasas SC managers
Association football central defenders
Expatriate football managers in Argentina
Expatriate football managers in Uruguay
Hungarian expatriate sportspeople in Argentina
Hungarian expatriate sportspeople in Romania
Hungarian expatriate sportspeople in Italy
Hungarian expatriate sportspeople in Brazil
Hungarian expatriate sportspeople in Uruguay
Hungarian expatriate sportspeople in Switzerland
Hungarian expatriate sportspeople in the Netherlands
Hungarian expatriate sportspeople in the United States
Nemzeti Bajnokság I managers